Counting Sheep is an album of children's music, released in 2000, by American country music artist Collin Raye. It did not produce any chart singles, and was intended as a side project.

Track listing

All track information was taken from the CD liner notes.

Personnel
 Joe Chemay - bass guitar, background vocals
 Jim Cox - keyboards, Hammond organ
 Steve Gibson - electric guitar, mandolin
 Tom Hemby - acoustic guitar
 Wes Hightower - background vocals
 John Hobbs - keyboards, Hammond organ, piano, synthesizer
 John Jorgenson - clarinet, dulcimer, acoustic guitar, electric guitar, mandolin, tin whistle, ukulele
 Paul Leim - drums, snare drums, percussion
 Melissa Manchester - vocals on "A Mother and Father's Prayer"
 Liana Manis - background vocals
 Steve Nathan - keyboards, Hammond organ, piano
 Dean Parks - acoustic guitar
 Larry Paxton - upright bass
 Collin Raye - lead vocals
 John Robinson - drums, snare drums
 Leland Sklar - bass guitar
 Biff Watson - acoustic guitar
 Dennis Wilson - background vocals

References

External links
 LA Times, A Lively Album by a Cool Country Cat 

2000 albums
Collin Raye albums
Epic Records albums
Children's music albums by American artists